Psyclone may refer to:

Psyclone (Canada's Wonderland), at Six Flags Magic Mountain
Psyclone (roller coaster)
Psyclone (album), a 1995 album by Jimmy Barnes
"Psyclones", a song by Psycho Realm from their 1997 album, The Psycho Realm
"Psyclone!", a song by Super Furry Animals from their 2005 album, Love Kraft
Psyclones, an experimental music industrial band

See also 
 Cyclone (disambiguation)